Milo Milan Lubratovich (May 30, 1907 – September 5, 1975) was a professional American football player who played offensive lineman for five seasons for the Brooklyn Dodgers.

References

1907 births
1975 deaths
All-American college football players
American football tackles
Brooklyn Dodgers (NFL) players
Wisconsin Badgers football players